Nieuwoudtville is a town in Namakwa District Municipality in the Northern Cape province of South Africa. The town lies on the Bokkeveld Escarpment, and was established in 1897. The Nieuwoudtville Falls on the Doring River are located a few kilometres north of the town.

Nieuwoudtville is in the Succulent Karroo Biome, which has less than 200 mm rainfall in winter and is even more arid in summer. However the region about this community is an oasis in the Biome, with the Doring River falling off the escarpment nearby.

Nieuwoudtville is a popular tourist destination in South Africa, especially during the wild flower season, because of its unique placement in the Karoo. The Karoo plain is known as the Bokkeveld and has a reputation as the bulb capital of the world. During spring geophytes, also known as bulbs, bloom in the area around the town. The bulbs are very rain dependent. There is also a bulb nursery where you can pick up your own bulbs to plant back at home.

Other than the bulb flower season, there are a wide variety of attractions in Nieuwoudtville such as a waterfall just outside the town, a quiver tree forest, local sandstone ruins, glacial pavement, the Oorlogskloof Nature Reserve and a myriad activities that include bird watching, hiking and a star gazing.

References

External links 
 Nieuwoudtville in the Karoo, South Africa
 

Populated places in the Hantam Local Municipality
Populated places established in 1897
1897 establishments in the Cape Colony